Paringa may refer to:



Australia
Paringa, South Australia, a town and locality 
Paringa Bridge, a bridge across the Murray River in South Australia
District Council of Paringa, a former local government area in South Australia, now part of the Renmark Paringa Council
Hundred of Paringa, a cadastral unit in South Australia
SS Paringa, a steam ship operated by the Adelaide Steamship Company

New Zealand
Lake Paringa, in New Zealand
Paringa River, in New Zealand

United States
Paringa, California, a former town in Imperial County

See also
Baringa (disambiguation)
Pringá